Wallern may refer to the following places:

 Wallern im Burgenland, in Burgenland, Austria
 Wallern an der Trattnach, in Upper Austria, Austria
 the German name for Volary, Czech Republic
 SV Wallern, Austrian football club